, currently known as , is a Japanese terrestrial commercial television broadcasting company headquartered in Fukui, Japan. The company was established on October 1, 1969. Fukui TV is a member of Fuji News Network - Fuji Network System keyed by Fuji Television.

TV channel

Digital Television 
 Fukui 22ch 1 kW JOFI-DTV

Translators 
 Ōno 42ch 10W
 Katsuyama 30ch 3W
 Tsuruga 26ch 10W
 Obama 31ch 10W
 Mihama 26ch 10W
 Kaminaka 33ch 3W
 Mikuni 31ch 3W
 Sabae-Kawada 42ch 1W
 Takefu-minami 32ch 1W

Program

External links

Official website Fukui Television 

Television stations in Japan
Fuji News Network
Mass media in Fukui (city)
Television channels and stations established in 1969
Mass media companies established in 1969
Companies based in Fukui Prefecture
1969 establishments in Japan